Chia Lien-chen (born 28 December 1912, date of death unknown) was a Chinese middle-distance runner. He competed in the men's 1500 metres at the 1936 Summer Olympics. Chia was the winner of the 800 metres and 1500 metres at the 1935 Chinese National Games.

He went to Taiwan during the Chinese Civil War and headed Kaohsiung's Sports Development Bureau from 1953 to 1957.

References

1912 births
Year of death missing
Athletes (track and field) at the 1936 Summer Olympics
Chinese male middle-distance runners
Olympic athletes of China
Runners from Shanghai
Taiwanese people from Shanghai